Sagittaria isoetiformis, common name quillwort arrowhead, is an aquatic plant species native to Cuba and to the southeastern United States (Florida, Alabama, Mississippi, Georgia, North Carolina and South Carolina).

Sagittaria isoetiformis is similar to Sagittaria tenuis and often mistaken for it, but Sagittaria isoetiformis has flattened leaves rather than leaves round in cross-section. Leaves of both species are usually submerged but sometimes emerging from the water.

References

External links
photo of herbarium specimen at Missouri Botanical Garden, syntype of Sagittaria isoetiformis
Landscape Plants for South Florida Sagittaria isoetiformis
Aquaportail Sagittaria isoetiformis
Gardening Europe, Piantaggine d acqua Sagittaria isoetiformis J.G. Sm. 

isoetiformis
Freshwater plants
Flora of Cuba
Flora of the Southeastern United States
Plants described in 1895
Flora without expected TNC conservation status